The 2007 First Division season was the 39th of the amateur competition of the first-tier football in the Gambia.  The tournament was organized by the Gambian Football Association (GFA) .  The season began on March 1 and finished on June 24.  The Real de Banjul won the tenth title after finishing with 32 points, due to financial concerns, they did not participate by the GFA in the 2008 CAF Champions League the following season. Gambia Ports Authority, winner of the 2007 Gambian Cup  and qualified and competed in the 2008 CAF Confederation Cup.  It was the last season featuring ten clubs, two additional clubs would be added in the following season neither the last two clubs were relegated.

The season featured a total of 162 matches and scored a total of 140, nearly the same from the 2005 season with nearly 40% more.

Gambia Ports Authority was again the defending team of the title. Both Wallidan and Hawks of Banjul or Bajau scored the most goals numbering 19.

Participating clubs

 Wallidan FC
 Steve Biko FC
 Real de Banjul
 Sea View FC - Promoted from the Second Division
 Hawks FC

 Gambia Ports Authority FC
 Armed Forces FC
 Bakau United
 Sait Matty FC - Promoted from the Second Division
 Gamtel FC

Overview
The league was contested by 10 teams with Real de Banjul winning the championship.

League standings

See also
GFA League First Division

Footnotes

External links
Historic results at rsssf.com

Gambia
Gambia
GFA League First Division seasons
First